Zion Long (born 18 July 2003) is a Nigerian footballer who plays as a forward for USL Championship club Sporting Kansas City II via the Sporting Kansas City academy.

Club career
Long was born in Port Harcourt, Nigeria, but grew up in Olathe, Kansas. He joined the Sporting Kansas City academy in 2018, going on to sign a USL academy contract with Sporting's USL Championship side Sporting Kansas City II. He made his debut for the team on 7 August 2021, starting during a 4–1 loss to Louisville City.

Career statistics

References

External links
 Profile at Sporting Kansas City

2003 births
Living people
Association football forwards
Expatriate soccer players in the United States
Nigerian expatriate footballers
Nigerian expatriate sportspeople in the United States
Nigerian footballers
Sportspeople from Olathe, Kansas
Sporting Kansas City II players
Soccer players from Kansas
USL Championship players
Sportspeople from Port Harcourt